Ciudad de Móstoles Fútbol Sala is a futsal club based in Móstoles.

History
The club was founded in 2009 after FS Móstoles was disbanded. Youth teams of FS Móstoles were moved to Ciudad de Móstoles FS. Senior team was created in 2009–10 season.

From 2014–15 season, the club only compete with youth teams, disenrolling the first team that had played in Segunda División B in 2013–14 season.

club names
Boadilla Las Rozas/Móstoles Mirasierra - (2009–10)
Las Rozas Boadilla/Móstoles - (2010–11)
Ciudad de Móstoles - (2011– )

Season to season

5 seasons in Segunda División B

References

External links
Official website

Futsal clubs in Spain
Futsal clubs established in 2009
2009 establishments in Spain
Sport in Móstoles
Sports teams in the Community of Madrid